This is a list of heads of government of French Cameroon (Cameroun).

Affiliations

See also 

List of colonial governors of French Cameroon
Colonial governors of British Cameroon (Cameroons)
Heads of government of British Cameroon (Cameroons)
Colonial heads of German Cameroon (Kamerun)
Colonial heads of Ambas Bay (Victoria Colony)

Heads of government
French heads
Cameroon
French Cameroon
French heads of government